The Spy is a 1914 American silent adventure film based on the 1821 novel of the same name by James Fenimore Cooper, directed by Otis Turner, and released by Universal Studios.

Cast

 Herbert Rawlinson as Harvey Birch (the spy)
 Edna Maison as Katrie (sweetheart of Harvey Birch)
 Ella Hall as Frances Wharton
 William Worthington as Gen. Washington
 Edward Alexander as Maj. Dunwoodie
 Rex De Rosselli as Mr. Wharton
 J. W. Pike as Henry (son of Mr. Wharton)
 Frank Lloyd as Jake Parsons

References

External links
 
 
 Edward Harris. Cooper on Film at James Fenimore Cooper Society Website

1914 films
American black-and-white films
American silent feature films
American historical adventure films
Universal Pictures films
Films based on works by James Fenimore Cooper
1910s historical adventure films
Films directed by Otis Turner
1910s American films
Silent historical adventure films
1910s English-language films